Sunshine at Midnight is the second studio album by American singer Sunshine Anderson. It was released in the United States by Music World Entertainment on January 23, 2007.

Critical reception

AllMusic wrote that Anderson's "second album, imaginatively produced with a wide range of hip, grainy-sounding beats, deals with the tough realities of relationships, in songs as varied as the grittily realistic "Problems," "Switch It Up," superficially about romance gone stale but more concerned with turning a life around, and the galumphing "Trust," whose mutant beat buffers a tale of deceit. Anderson never leaves any doubt who's in control, though she can still turn on the erotic softness in silk-sheet jams like "Force of Nature"."

Track listing

Sample credits
 "Something I Wanna Give You" contains a sample of "I Want to Pay You Back (For Loving Me)", as performed by The Chi-Lites
 "My Whole Life" contains a sample of "Back Against the Wall", as performed by Curtis Mayfield

Personnel

 Joan Allen – photography
 Sunshine Anderson – executive producer
 Yummy Bingham – backing vocals
 Big Bert – programming
 Junius Bervine – programming
 Gerry Brown – recording engineer
 Mike City – programming
 Mikey Dan – backing vocals
 Dr. Dre – mixing
 Blake English – recording engineer
 Flintstone – programming
 Brian Gardner – mastering
 Daniel Garraga – photography
 Chris Gehringer – mastering
 Franny "Franchise" Graham – mixing, recording engineer
 Jeri Heiden – art direction, design
 Alonzo Jackson – programming, recording engineer
 Taura Jackson – backing vocals
 Mathew Knowles – executive producer
 Dave Lopez – mixing
 Stephen Marsh – mastering
 Mattmatix – recording engineer
 Walter Milsap III – bass, programming, recording engineer
 Conesha Monet – backing vocals
 Glen Nakasako – art direction, design
 Candice Nelson – recording engineer
 Nottz – programming, recording engineer
 Frederico Perez – executive producer
 Isaac Phillips – guitar
 Danny Romero – mixing
 Raphael Saadiq – bass, guitar, programming
 Clay Sears – guitar
 Daryl Sloan – recording engineer
 Tatsuya Soto – recording engineer
 John Tanksley – recording engineer
 Brindin "Nytro" Taylor – additional keyboards

Charts

References

2007 albums
Albums produced by Raphael Saadiq
Sunshine Anderson albums